Bushloe High School was a middle school with academy status located in Wigston, Leicestershire, England.

Admissions
It was a middle school, using the three-tier education system (invented in Leicestershire in the early 1960s as part of the Leicestershire Plan, later adopted by some parts of the UK, notably Northumberland and Bedfordshire). Many middle schools in Leicestershire returned to the more traditional age ranges in 2009. Middle schools are classed as secondary schools.

It was situated on the B582 in Wigston, next to two other schools - a middle school (Abington Academy) with the same age ranges as Bushloe, and a college (Guthlaxton College), both of which, in September 2015, merged with Bushloe to become Wigston College - opposite Oadby and Wigston council offices at Bushloe House, after which the school was named.

History
Bushloe High School opened in September 1959.

Headteachers 
Ann Webster 2004-2015

New building
A new building was opened in 2006. The former building was completely demolished, except the older sports hall, which was used by Abington Academy, which neighboured Bushloe.

Merger 
A merger with neighbouring school Abington Academy was proposed towards the end of 2013. After several consultation periods, it was announced in Spring 2015 that Bushloe would close and merge into Abington in September 2015 to form Wigston Academy under the new trust, Wigston Academies Trust. In September 2015, the age range of the school changed from 10 - 14 to 11 - 16.

Activities
The Leicestershire Schools Symphony Orchestra used the school over many years for weekly practice sessions.

Notable former pupils
 Luke Abraham, rugby player
 Rosemary Conley, exercise guru
 Harry Ellis, rugby player
 Prof Mark A. Smith, neuroscientist
Hamza Choudhury, football player
Harry Panayiotou, football player

See also
 List of middle schools in England

References

External links
 EduBase
 Pictures of the former building demolition 

Educational institutions established in 1959
Defunct schools in Leicestershire
Oadby and Wigston
1959 establishments in England
Educational institutions disestablished in 2015
2015 disestablishments in England